Master Cylinder is the debut studio album of Caveman Shoestore, released in 1992 by Tim/Kerr.

Track listing

Personnel
Adapted from the Master Cylinder liner notes.

Caveman Shoestore
 Fred Chalenor – bass guitar, banjo 
 Elaine di Falco – vocals, keyboards
 Henry Franzoni – drums, percussion, vocals , marimba 

Production and design
 Drew Canulette – production
 John Golden – mastering
 Mike King – cover art, design
 Alessandro Monti – production

Release history

References

External links 
 Master Cylinder at Discogs (list of releases)

1992 albums
Caveman Shoestore albums
Tim/Kerr Records albums